"If Ever" is a song by Hawaiian singer-songwriters Paula Fuga and Jack Johnson featuring Ben Harper. The song was released on April 16, 2021, and is the lead single from Fuga's  studio album Rain on Sunday, to be released via Brushfire Records. Fuga and Johnson also performed the song for Earth Day Live 2021. The song was released to Triple-A radio on April 19 in the United States.

Composition 
The song was written by Johnson and Fuga about their fathers, who had both passed away. Johnson had the melody and some of the lyrics in his head for years. Fuga then added some of her shared experiences into the song as well.  Ben Harper was added and plays the lap steel guitar in the song.

Personnel 
Adapted from Tidal

 Paula Fuga – vocals, glockenspiel
 Jack Johnson – vocals, guitar
 Ben Harper – lap steel guitar
 Adam Topol – drums
 Brad Watanabe – bass, ukulele
 Robert Carranza – mixing
 Simon Beins – engineer

Charts

Release history

References 

2021 songs
2021 singles
Ben Harper songs
Jack Johnson (musician) songs
Songs written by Jack Johnson (musician)